Valentin or Valentín is a surname. Notable people with the surname include:

Barbara Valentin (1940–2002), Austrian actress
Dave Valentin (1952–2017), American Latin jazz flautist
Isabelle Valentin (born 1962), French politician
Javier Valentín (born 1975), Puerto Rican baseball player
Jesmuel Valentín (born 1994), Puerto Rican baseball player
José Valentín (born 1969), Puerto Rican baseball player 
Katy Valentin (1902-1970), Danish stage and film actress
Lydia Valentín (born 1985), Spanish Olympic weightlifter